Mitella diphylla (twoleaf miterwort, two-leaved mitrewort, or bishop's cap) is a clump forming, open woodland plant native to northeast and midwest regions of North America.

Description
Miterwort grows from a rhizomatous root system with fibrous roots. Leaves are coarsely toothed with 3-5 shallow lobes. Most leaves are basal, and there is one opposite pair of stemless leaves on each flower stalk.

The seeds are tiny, produced in small green cups, formed from the sepals of the flower, and when ripe are shiny and black. They are spread when raindrops hit the cups and splash the seeds out.

It grows in high quality mesic forests on moist, mossy ledges and north-facing slopes. The Latin specific epithet diphylla means two-leaved and is in reference to the non-basal leaves.

Ecology
The flowers produce both pollen and nectar. Due to their small size, they are mainly visited by small bees and flies: for instance, Lasioglossum sweat bees, small carpenter bees (Ceratina) and hoverflies.

Cultivation
This species is grown as an ornamental plant in shade gardens. It prefers wet-mesic to dry soil and partial shade.

References

External links

 

diphylla
Flora of North America
Plants described in 1753
Taxa named by Carl Linnaeus